Buy Me is a 2018 Russian crime drama film directed by Vadim  Perelman. It was nominated for the Golden St. George  Award at the 39st Moscow International Film Festival.

Plot
Katya Korolyova from Moscow, a student of the Faculty of Philology, who won a grant to study the archives of the Russian poet Vladislav Khodasevich in Paris, secretly from her mother, instead of a study trip, goes to Abu Dhabi to build a  career in modeling  there. As a result, she actually turns out to be among the girls who have to please the Arab sheikhs for money. Thanks to the scandal arranged by Katya, the group of  models  is sent back to Russia.

Returning to Moscow, the adventurer Katya and her two newly-made provincial friends Liza and Galya rent one apartment for three and begin to live off wealthy men, usually married. More experienced friends teach naive Katya how to hunt oligarchs correctly in order to secure a luxurious and carefree future for herself. In pursuit of the dream of a beautiful life, friends will have to make a difficult choice and sacrifice something.

Cast 
 Yulia Khlynina as Katya Korolyova 
 Anna Adamovich as Liza
 Svetlana Ustinova as Galya
 Mikael Janibekyan as  Suren
 Ivan Dobronravov as Misha
 Evgeniya Kryukova as Olga, Katya's mother
 Alexander Oblasov as  taxi driver
 Evgeniya Dmitrieva as business lady
 Klim Shipenko as anesthesiologist

Critical response 
Film critic Boris Ivanov  in Film.ru notes in his review:
The heroines do not win special audience sympathy, but they do not need it, because you watch the film to find out what else the girls will throw out and how else they will joke. A cynical Russian comedy about girls of easy virtue, which awkwardly turns into a drama in the finale.

In turn, Zinaida Pronchenko said:
We have seen all this many, many times in films with varying degrees of unconvincingness, ridiculing the lack of spirituality in the capital. Heroes without a past and a future wander in the fog of modernity, the era is recognized by brands, gadgets, musical hits and Internet memes. But, in general, the authors do not know anything about their characters.

References

External links

Films directed by Vadim Perelman
2018 crime drama films
Russian crime drama films
Films set in Moscow
2018 drama films
Films produced by Fyodor Bondarchuk